The Mon Taing Pin massacre was a mass killing of civilians by Burmese military forces on 11 May 2022, in the village of Mondaingbin, Sagaing Region, Myanmar. During the massacre, Myanmar Army troops executed at least 37 villagers. Sagaing Region later became the site of several additional mass killings perpetrated by the Burmese military, including the Letyetkon and Tadaing massacres.

Background 

On 1 February 2021, the Myanmar Armed Forces staged a coup d'état and deposed the democratically elected government led by the National League for Democracy. Shortly thereafter, the military established a junta, the State Administration Council (SAC), and declared a national state of emergency. In response, civilians throughout the country staged large-scale protests to resist the military takeover. 

By May 2021, the civilian-led resistance had escalated into a civil war against the SAC, which was unwilling to compromise. Mondaingbin (variously spelt Montaingbin, Mone Taing Pin, Mon Taing Pin, Mone Tine Pin, and Mon Tine Pin) is situated in the traditional Bamar Buddhist heartland, which quickly emerged as a stronghold of resistance against military rule.

Given the fierce resistance by locals in Sagaing Region, by November 2021, the Burmese military had begun launching airstrikes in the region to regain control, forcing thousands of villagers to flee. To suppress resistance, the Burmese army has employed a 'four cuts' strategy, to cut off resistance groups from access to food, financing, intelligence, and recruits, by denying humanitarian access to survivors, razing entire villages, and using indiscriminate airstrikes and artillery shelling. In December 2021, the Burmese army killed 11 villagers in the village of Dondaw, in neighbouring Salingyi Township. The following month, another 6 individuals were killed in the village of Thitseingyi in neighbouring Wetlet Township.

Incident 
On 10 May 2022, around 6 am, 150 to 200 soldiers shelled the village of Mondaingbin with heavy artillery, a total of 10,000 residents from 10 nearby villages to flee. Approximately 100 villagers who could not escape in time took refuge at the local Buddhist monastery. By 9 am, forces entered the monastery, where they tortured, interrogated, and detained the remaining villagers.  

The following morning, around 6 am, army troops forced 10 young male villagers to carry army belongings to the Mu River. Afterwards, they were hacked with machetes and burned by forces. That afternoon, between 2:30 and 3 pm, the remaining captives were rounded up and executed at Zeya Theikdi pagoda by gunshot. According to villagers, eight villagers were spared from execution after a Buddhist monk had intervened. 

Troops departed to nearby Pontaka village at 2 am the following day. The survivors, including 8 men, and 50 women and children, were subsequently released. After their release, survivors extinguished fires set by military forces throughout the village, and uncovered at least 29 charred bodies. A total of 94 buildings were destroyed during the attack. A few days after the massacre, villagers later found another 11 corpses in the nearby village of Einbin.

Perpetrators 
The massacre was carried out by Taikkyi-based troops from the 708 Light Infantry Battalion (LIB), under the command of Lieutenant Colonel Tun Lin Aung. Tun Lin Aung reports to Brigadier General Kyi Thaik, the head of the 4th Military Operations Command (MOC-4), which is based in Yangon. Kyi Thaik ultimately reports to Min Aung Hlaing, who also heads the military junta, the State Administration Council. Villagers also reported that members of a pro-military Pyusawhti militia had also helped carry out the raid.

Victims 
All victims were male, ranging from the ages of 25 to 64. Victims included Buddhist monks and three resistance fighters from the People's Defence Force. Several victims were found blindfolded, with their throats slit or with gunshot wounds, while others were charred, showing signs of murder. Several victims belonged to the National League for Democracy while others belonged to the military's proxy party, the Union Solidarity and Development Party.

Aftermath 
The following month, military troops killed an additional 6 civilians in the nearby village of Kanbya in neighbouring Myinmu Township.

Villagers in nearby Ayadaw Township later found the cell phone of a soldier involved in the massacre. The cell phone had documented photos and videos of the raid, including villagers detained at the monastery, and the remains of executed captives. The phone's cache also contained video footage of soldiers, including a sergeant, boasting of their kill counts, and the explaining various methods they had used to dismember bodies.

Reactions

Domestic 

On 24 May 2022, the opposition National Unity Government of Myanmar called for justice in response to the massacre. On 23 July, it released additional statistics from the massacre. The military junta's spokesman Zaw Min Tun initially dismissed the reported deaths, calling them "fabricated." He later acknowledged the military was investigating the incident.

International 
In July 2022, Human Rights Watch called the massacre "gruesome" and "shocking" and called for UN member states to impose a arms embargo on the Burmese military, and to refer the situation to the International Criminal Court.

See also 

 2021 Myanmar coup d'état
 Myanmar civil war (2021–present)
 List of massacres in Myanmar

References

External link 

 RFA report on Mondaingbin massacre (in English)

2022 in Myanmar
2022 murders in Myanmar
Massacres in 2022
Internal conflict in Myanmar
Massacres in Myanmar
21st-century mass murder in Myanmar
May 2022 events in Asia
May 2022 crimes in Asia
Sagaing Region
Attacks in Myanmar